Järsnäs Church is a church building at the village of Järsnäs in Jönköping County, Sweden. It belongs to Lekeryd Parish in the Diocese of Växjö of the Church of Sweden. The  medieval era church was  restored in 1906 under the direction of architect August Atterström  (1865-1930). It underwent additional restoration  and modernization during 1937.

References

Churches in Jönköping Municipality
Churches in the Diocese of Växjö